Pavel Konovalov is the name of:

 Pavel Konovalov (officer) (1908-1945), Soviet army officer and Hero of the Soviet Union
 Pavel Konovalov (sprinter) (born 1960), Soviet sprinter
 Pavel Konovalov (canoeist) (born 1967), Russian canoeist